General Hitchcock may refer to:

Basil Hitchcock (1877–1938), British Army lieutenant general
Ethan A. Hitchcock (general) (1798–1870), Union Army major general

See also
Attorney General Hitchcock (disambiguation)